Aleksandr Dokhlyakov (born 26 January 1942) is a Soviet former cyclist. He competed in the team time trial at the 1968 Summer Olympics.

References

External links
 

1942 births
Living people
Soviet male cyclists
Olympic cyclists of the Soviet Union
Cyclists at the 1968 Summer Olympics
People from Tambov